Eumetadrillia is a genus of sea snails, marine gastropod mollusks in the family Drilliidae.

Species
Species within the genus Eumetadrillia include:
 † Eumetadrillia acidna Woodring, 1970
 † Eumetadrillia dodona Gardner, 1937
 † Eumetadrillia mauryae Perrilliat, 1973
 † Eumetadrillia rabdotacona. Gardner, 1937
 † Eumetadrillia serra Woodring, 1928
 † Eumetadrillia thalmanni Perrilliat, 1973 
All these species are only known from fossils from the Middle Miocene in Central America (Mexico, Panama). An alternate representation is under Agladrillia (Eumetadrillia), which contains also one recent species Agladrillia (Eumetadrillia) fuegiensis (Smith, E.A., 1888)

References

 W. P. Woodring. 1928. Miocene Molluscs from Bowden, Jamaica. Part 2: Gastropods and discussion of results . Contributions to the Geology and Palaeontology of the West Indies
 Bouchet P., Kantor Yu.I., Sysoev A. & Puillandre N. (2011) A new operational classification of the Conoidea. Journal of Molluscan Studies 77: 273-308.

External links
 WMSDB - Worldwide Mollusc Species Data Base: family Drilliidae